José María Cirarda Lachiondo (23 May 1917 – 17 September 2008) was a Spanish Bishop of the Roman Catholic Church.

Lachiondo was born in Baquio, Spain and was ordained a priest on 5 July 1942. Lachiondo was appointed auxiliary bishop of the Archdiocese of Seville as well as Titular Bishop of Drusiliana on 9 April 1960 and ordained a bishop on 29 June 1960. He was appointed bishop of the Diocese of Santander on 22 July 1968 and then the Diocese of Córdoba in Spain on 3 December 1971. On 31 December 1978 Lachiondo was appointed to the Archdiocese of Pamplona y Tudela and would remain at diocese until retirement on 26 March 1993.

See also
Archdiocese of Pamplona y Tudela
Archdiocese of Seville
Diocese of Santander
Diocese of Córdoba

References

External links
Catholic-Hierarchy 
Pamplona Y Tudela Site
Cordoba Site
Samtamder Site

1917 births
2008 deaths
20th-century Roman Catholic bishops in Spain
Participants in the Second Vatican Council